Elin Anna Maria Holmlöv (born 5 August 1987) is a Swedish retired ice hockey player. She plays forward position for the Sweden women's national ice hockey team. She won the bronze medal at the 2007 Women's World Ice Hockey Championships in Winnipeg, Manitoba.

She played four years of college ice hockey with the Minnesota Duluth Bulldogs women's ice hockey program at the University of Minnesota Duluth.

In 2011–12, Holmlov played with Team Sweden teammates Kim Martin and Danijela Rundqvist for Moscow Tornado in the Russian Women's Hockey League.

References

External links
 
 
 

1987 births
Ice hockey players at the 2010 Winter Olympics
Living people
Minnesota Duluth Bulldogs women's ice hockey players
Olympic ice hockey players of Sweden
People from Knivsta Municipality
Swedish women's ice hockey forwards
AIK Hockey Dam players
HC Tornado players
Sportspeople from Uppsala County